The DR Class E 42 is a class of electric locomotives formerly operated by the Deutsche Reichsbahn in East Germany. They were later operated by Deutsche Bahn, designated as Class 142.

Technical specifications

History
A total of 292 locomotives have been built. From 1970 onward, they were designated as Class 242. Some locomotives were acquired by Lokoop and hired out for services in Switzerland.

References

Further reading

Electric locomotives of Germany
15 kV AC locomotives
E 42
Standard gauge locomotives of Germany
LEW locomotives